Karacabey Belediyespor is a football club from the Karacabey district of the Bursa Province.

History 

Nilüfer was the place were the club was founded as Nilüfer Belediyespor in 1999. The football branch split up in 2008 to become Bursa Nilüferspor A.Ş.. It was caused by government limitations against local municipalities to financially support and legally own professional football clubs. In 2016 businessmen from the Karacabey municipality bought the shares of the club and changed its name into Karacabey Birlikspor A.Ş.. In August 2018 the club changed its name into Karacabey Belediye Spor A.Ş..

Stadium 
The Mustafa Fehmi Gerçeker stadium is the homeground of the club, giving place to 2,722 spectators. It refers to Mustafa Fehmi Gerçeker; a Turkish theologian and politician from Bursa.

Current squad

Out on loan

References

External links 
Karacabey Belediyespor on TFF.org

Sport in Bursa
Football clubs in Turkey
Association football clubs established in 1999
1999 establishments in Turkey